Angara is a 1985 Pakistani Punjabi language action film. It was directed and produced by Mohammad Ikram and starred Yousuf Khan in the lead role with Aasia, Ilyas Kashmiri, Sultan Rahi as the villain.

Cast
 Yousuf Khan as Jagga
 Aasia as (lover of Jagga)
 Sultan Rahi as (Sohna Daku)
 Allauddin as (Moulvie Saab)
 Ilyas Kashmiri as (Jageerdar)
 Sabiha Khanum as (mother of Jageerdar)
 Saiqa as (Sister of Jagga)
 Rehan
 Neelofar
 Khalid Saleem Mota
 Tariq Shah as (Farangi)
 Khawar Abbas
 Shahida
 Imrozia
 Iqbal Durrani
 Changezi
 Nadir Shah

Track list
The music of the film Angara is by famous musician Kamal Ahmed. The lyrics are penned by Waris Ludhianvi and Saeed Gailani and the playback singers are 
 Shaukat Ali
 Mehnaz
 Naheed Akhtar 
 Masood Rana

References

External links
 

Pakistani biographical films
Pakistani action films
1985 films
1980s musical films
Punjabi-language Pakistani films
1980s Punjabi-language films